The Global Press Institute is a Washington DC-based 501(c)(3) nonprofit organization that builds and maintains news bureaus in some of the world's least-covered places, staffed by local women journalists whose social, historical and political context distinguishes them from foreign correspondents.

The organization consists of three divisions: Global Press Institute, which focuses on training local women to become journalists in developing media markets; Global Press Journal, the organization's award-winning multilingual news publication; and Global Press News Services, which sells a customized Duty of Care program, a Style Guide workshop, access to a photo archive, and other products and services to media, education, and corporate syndication partners.

History

GPI was founded in 2006 by Cristi Hegranes, a young American journalist. A year earlier, Hegranes had been working as a foreign correspondent in Nepal when she realized that a local woman was better equipped to report on a community's story because she had more cultural and historical context and had access to reliable sources.  She returned to the United States, quit her job, and asked everyone she knew for $40. With the $10,000 she raised, she founded Global Press Institute.

In 2006, Hegranes performed the first GPI training in Chiapas, Mexico, where five women were trained in the principles and practice of traditional investigative journalism. The stories, which covered topics such as AIDS, poverty, clandestine abortion and community development, were the first that were published by the Global Press Journal. Hegranes established a second news bureau in Nepal. As of 2022, the organization has trained and employed 250 journalists in 40 bureaus. In addition to print journalism, GPI training includes photo and video journalism.

Mission and Impact

Global Press creates a more informed and inclusive world by training and employing local women journalists to report news in their own communities, some of the world's least-covered places.

GPI reporters have covered a range of issues such as caste discrimination and political rape. Founder Hegranes has said more than 25 percent of GPI's reporting has created social change in the form of protests, attracting media attention, and helping to change laws in Nepal and Rwanda and some community policies in Zambia.

Locations

In 2022, GPJ employed journalists in Argentina, Democratic Republic of Congo, Haiti, India, Kenya, Mexico, Mongolia, Nepal, Puerto Rico, Sri Lanka, Uganda, United States, Zambia and Zimbabwe.

Training

Training is provided in the prospective journalist's local language; English proficiency is not a requirement. Some GPI journalists have only a fourth-grade literacy level. GPI currently provides training in six languages.

GPI implements a training-to-employment mode. Trainees enroll in a 16-week program, during which they learn the principles and practice of investigative journalism through classroom-style training and direct content-production. Upon completion of the training, graduates are offered full-time, paid employment with Global Press Journal. The journalists are offered professional development opportunities and refresher courses throughout their employment at Global Press Journal.

Funding and Support

GPI does not accept government funding or anonymous support. It currently relies on individual and institutional donors, with plans to move towards sustainability through syndication revenue generated from Global Press News Services. Its donors include the MacArthur Foundation, Emerson Collective, Luminate, Fondation CHANEL, and The Susie Tompkins Buell Foundation.

Global Press Journal
Global Press Journal is an award-winning multilingual news publication featuring stories from Global Press reporters across its news bureaus. Each employee earns a living wage as well as access to continuing education.

Global Press offers ongoing training to its reporters, including on topics such as climate change and other issues, as well as professional development and technical skills. The reporters cover a range of topics including arts and culture, business, climate, community, economic justice, education, environment, gender justice, health, human rights, migration, and politics.

Editorial Process
GPJ’s model requires that each reporter choose her own story and report it exclusively for Global Press. The stories are published in English and their local language, and all of them adhere to the Global Press Style Guide, a living document that establishes rules for referring to people and places in Global Press' coverage communities and promotes dignity and precision in international journalism. All of the stories are "certified as accurate" by the Global Press Accuracy Network, a team of editors, copy editors, fact checkers, researchers, translators, and interpreters, who together uphold the highest standards of journalism.

Awards
Global Press and its reporters have received international awards and accolades including:

2022 Grand Stevie Award, Stevie Awards for Women in Business, awarded to Global Press Institute
2022 Community Award, Online News Association (ONA), awarded to Manori Wijesekera, Global Press training manager
2022 World Changing Ideas, Fast Company magazine, awarded to Global Press
2021 Emerson Collective Dial Fellowship, awarded to Cristi Hegranes
2021 Clarion Award for Online Journalism, Journalistic Excellence, awarded to GPJ reporter Shilu Manandhar, Global Press Nepal
2021 Webby Award, Best Practices on a Website, International Academy of Digital Arts and Sciences, awarded to Global Press Journal
2021 Gold Medal, International Annual Report Design Awards, awarded to Global Press
2021 MUSE Creative Award, International Awards Associate, awarded to Global Press Journal
2021 Print Award (longlist), One World Media, awarded to GPJ reporter Shilu Manandhar, Global Press Nepal
2021 Award of Excellence, Society for News Design, awarded to Global Press Journal
2021 Award of Excellence, The Communicator Awards, awarded to Global Press and Global Press Journal
2020 Media Hero of the Year, Stevie Awards for Women in Business, awarded to GPJ reporters
2020 Best News Website, Vega Awards, awarded to GPJ reporter Merveille Kavira Luneghe, Global Press DRC
2020 Clarion Award for Online Journalism, Association for Women in Communications, awarded to GPJ reporter Gamuchirai Masiyiwa, Global Press Zimbabwe
2020 Clarion Award for Online Journalism, Association for Women in Communications, awarded to GPJ reporter Merveille Kavira Luneghe, Global Press DRC
2020 Clarion Award for Special Print Communication, Association for Women in Communications, awarded to Global Press
2020 Chester M. Pierce Human Rights Award, American Psychiatric Association, awarded to Global Press
2020 Refugee Reporting Award (shortlist), One World Media, awarded to GPJ reporter Merveille Kavira Luneghe, Global Press DRC
2019 GLG Social Impact Fellowship, GLG, awarded to Cristi Hegranes
2019 Award of Excellence, Society for News Design, awarded to GPJ reporter Merveille Kavira Luneghe, Global Press DRC
2019 Best Places to Work, Inc. Magazine, awarded to Global Press
2019 Women-Run Workplace of the Year, Stevie Awards, awarded to Global Press
2018, Clarion Award for Online Journalism, Association for Women in Communications, awarded to GPJ senior reporters Kalpana Khanal, Shilu Manandhar, and Yam Kumari Kandel
2018 Media Professionalism Award, Voluntary Media Council of Zimbabwe, awarded to GPJ reporter Vimbai Chinembiri, Global Press Zimbabwe
2017 LACP Vision Awards, League of American Communications Professionals, awarded to Global Press
2017 Leadership Council, Classy, awarded to Cristi Hegranes
2017 Top 100 Most Innovative Organizations in the World, Classy Awards, awarded to Global Press
2017 WeWork Creator Awards, Scale Award, WeWork, awarded to Global Press Institute
2016 Best News Mobile Website, Mobile Web Awards, awarded to Global Press Journal
2016 Best Editorial Writing (Honoree), Webby Awards, awarded to Global Press Journal
2015 Persephone Miel Fellowship, Pulitzer Center for Crisis Reporting, awarded to GPJ reporter Yam Kandel, Global Press Nepal
2015 Persephone Miel Fellowship, Pulitzer Center for Crisis Reporting, awarded to GPJ reporter Shilu Manandhar, Global Press Nepal
2015, Persephone Miel Fellowship, Pulitzer Center for Crisis Reporting, awarded to GPJ reporter Wairimu Michengi, Global Press Kenya
2014, Boehm Media Fellowship, Opportunity Collaboration, awarded to Cristi Hegranes
2013 Ulrich Wickert Award for Child Rights, awarded to Gloriose Isugi and Noella Nbihogo, Rwanda News Desk
2012 Zambian Reporter of the Year, HIV/AIDS and Gender-based Violence Coverage, awarded to GPJ reporter Chanda Katango, Zambia News Desk
2012 Excellence in Epilepsy Reporting, the International Bureau of Epilepsy, awarded to GPJ reporter Comfort Mussa, Cameroon News Desk
2011 Elizabeth Neuffer Fellowship, International Women's Media Foundation, awarded to GPJ reporter Jackee Batanda, Uganda News Desk
2011 Kurt Schork Award, Excellence in International Journalism, Reuters, awarded to GPJ reporter Gertrude Pswarayi, Zimbabwe News Desk
2011 Kurt Schork Award, Excellence in International Journalism Shortlist, Reuters, awarded to GPJ senior reporter Tara Bhattarai, Nepal News Desk
2010 Journalism Innovation Prize, Society of Professional Journalists, awarded to Global Press Institute
2008 One of the 21 Leaders of the 21st Century, Women's ENews, awarded to Cristi Hegranes
2008 Ida B. Wells Award for Bravery in Journalism, Women's ENews, awarded to Cristi Hegranes

References

External links
 Global Press Institute homepage

American journalism organizations
Women's occupational organizations
Organizations established in 2006
Social enterprises
Ashoka Fellows